LA-30 is a constituency of Azad Kashmir Legislative Assembly which is currently represented by Mustafa Bashir Khan of Pakistan Muslim League (N). It covers the area of Sindh Balochistan and Punjab (except Gujranwala Division and Rawalpindi Division) in Pakistan. Only refugees from Jammu and Ladakh settled in Pakistan are eligible to vote.

Election 2016

elections were held in this constituency on 21 July 2016.

Azad Kashmir Legislative Assembly constituencies